This is a list of the first minority male lawyer(s) and judge(s) in Missouri. It includes the year in which the men were admitted to practice law (in parentheses). Also included are men who achieved other distinctions such becoming the first in their state to graduate from law school or become a political figure.

Firsts in Missouri's history

Lawyers 

 First African American male: John H. Johnson (1871) 
First African American male to argue a case before the Missouri Supreme Court: Walter M. Farmer (1889) in 1893

State judges 

First African American male: Walter M. Farmer (1889) during the 1890s 
 First African American male (elected): Crittenden Clark in 1922 
 First African American male (Missouri Court of Appeals): Theodore McMillian (1949) in 1972 
 First African American male (Missouri Supreme Court): Ronnie L. White (1983) in 1995
 First openly gay male: Lawrence E. Mooney: 
 First blind/Jewish male (Missouri Supreme Court): Richard B. Teitelman (1973) in 2002  
 First African American male (Missouri Supreme Court; Chief Justice): Ronnie L. White (1983) in 2003  
 First quadriplegic male: Jason Sengheiser in 2017

Federal judges 
 First African American male (U.S. Court of Appeals for the Eighth Circuit): Theodore McMillian (1949) in 1978  
 First African American male (U.S. District Court for the Eastern District of Missouri ): Clyde S. Cahill Jr. (1951) in 1980

Missouri Bar Association 

 First African American male president: Charlie J. Harris, Jr.

Firsts in local history 
 I. J. Ringolsky: First Jewish male to serve as the President of the Kansas City Bar Association (1940) [Cass, Clay, Jackson and Platte Counties, Missouri]
 Lewis W. Clymer: First African American male to serve as a Judge of the Jackson County Circuit Court (1970)
 Noah W. Parden (c. 1890): First African American male lawyer in St. Clair County, Missouri

 Eleazer Block (1814): First Jewish male lawyer in the independent city of St. Louis, Missouri (1817)
Crittenden Clark: First African American male to serve as the Justice of the Peace for St. Louis, Michigan (1922)

See also 

 List of first minority male lawyers and judges in the United States

Other topics of interest 

 List of first women lawyers and judges in the United States
 List of first women lawyers and judges in Missouri

References 

 
Minority, Missouri, first
Minority, Missouri, first
Legal history of Missouri
Lists of people from Missouri
Missouri lawyers